Pretend You're a Cat is a 1974 Children's book by Jean Marzollo and illustrators Jerry Pinkney or Marcia Sewall. It was originally published in 1974 by Harcourt Brace Jovanovich and re-illustrated with an revised edition was published by Dial Books in 1990., with full color art. It is a collection of 13 poems describing a different animal and inviting the reader to emulate each animal. Both Marcia Sewall and Jerry Pinkney's combine with watercolor, color pencil and drawings, different same as a black-and-white drawings with three colors of blue, pink, and green.

Reception
Booklist, in a review of Pretend You're a Cat, wrote "Challenging preschoolers to imitate pigs, cows, birds, and other animals, this upbeat picture book will appeal to their imagination and sense of fun. .. Simple in concept and inviting in design, this book will be a popular choice for story hours." and the School Library Journal "With minimal coaching, these delightful, simple rhymes will be easily learned, recited, and acted out." 
Publishers Weekly called it a "clever concept book" and wrote "The rhymed verses are vivid and straightforward, and Pinkney's inventive watercolor and pencil drawings and quite differently of Marcia Sewall's black and white drawings are as engaging as the characters and animals he portrays."

Pretend You're a Cat has also been reviewed by The Horn Book Magazine.

References

External links
Library holdings of Pretend You're a Cat
discussion of Pretend You're a Cat, Eric Carle Museum of Picture Book Art

1990 children's books
1990 poetry books
1974 children's books
1974 poetry books
American children's books
American poetry collections
Children's poetry books
Dial Press books
Picture books by Jerry Pinkney